Nevnihal Erdoğan (born 21 August 1959) is a Turkish architect and professor of architecture at the University of Kocaeli in İzmit.

Biography

Family and personal life 
Erdoğan was born on August 21, 1959, in Kars, Turkey.

She grew up bilingual, Turkish and English in a Turkish family from a father named Jemal And a mother named Hanim.

Academic career 
Erdoğan received a diploma in architecture from Istanbul Technical University in 1982, and M.S and Ph.D. from Istanbul Technical University in 1984 and 1992. She worked as lecture at Trakya University Department of Architecture during the years of 1992-2006 and is currently a professor in the Department of Architecture, University of Kocaeli. She has been as visiting scholarship at the University of California, Irvine, Department of Urban and Regional Planning School of Social Ecology and University of Wisconsin UW-Milwaukee School of Architecture.
She gave undergraduate and graduate courses and supervised Master thesis and Doctoral thesis, and is currently teaching architecture design; theory of design at undergraduate and graduate level. Her research interests are in the interrelationship between culture and architecture, housing and settlement, architecture design.

Works 
The majority of Erdoğan's publications have focused on historical Istanbul, Edirne and Izmit cities and their architecture. Her publication appears in the Journal of Architecture and Planning Research, Social Indicators Research, Open House International.

She is an author of eleven books,  four-section of book, editor of two proceedings and more than sixty papers issued in national and international proceeding books. She has completed various architectural projects and has participated in national-international competitions, research/projects.
In 2011–12, during her Aga Khan post-doctoral fellowship, she will investigate the urban history and architectural context of Ottoman Edirne.

1st International Urban Planning-Architecture-Design Congress, Urban Transformation, Conference 2014 and 12th International Conference: Standardization, Prototypes, and Quality: A Means of  Balkan Countries’Collaboration’ 2015 were organized as Congress chair by her. Erdoğan was the duty of dean at University of Kocaeli Faculty of Architecture and Design between 2013 and 2016. Now she is conducting to head of Architecture at University of Kocaeli.

Books

Selected articles 

 A Model Suggestion for Determining Physical and Socio-Cultural Changes of Traditional Settlements in Turkey, A/Z ITU  Journal of the Faculty of Architecture, vol.14 No.2, 2017, pp. 81–93.( Atik, D., Erdoğan, N.)
 Cultural Traditions and Domestic Space: Ağaçbekler Home, SAGE Open, DOI:10.1177/215824401773815, 2017, pp. 1–16.(Erdoğan, N.,)
 Investigation the Relationship Between Culture and Traditional Housing Architecture in Urfa, Turkey, Journal of Architectural and Planning Research (JAPR), 33:4 (Winter, 2016), pp. 309–325.(Erdoğan, N.,)
 Vernacular Builtscape Metamorphosis in Turkey, Journal of Architecture and Planning Research (JAPR), 25:3 (Autumn 2008), pp 221– 239 (Erdoğan, N.)
 Comparison of Urban Housing Satisfaction in Modern and Traditional Neighborhoods in Edirne, Social Indicators Research (2007) 81:127-148. (Erdoğan, N., Akyol, A., Ataman, B., Dökmeci, V.)
 Socioenvironmental Determinants of Social Interactions in A Squatter Settlement in İstanbul, Journal of Architecture and Planning Research (JAPR), 13:4 (Winter,1996), ( Erdoğan, N., Sağlamer, G., Dökmeci, V., Dikbaş, A.)
 A Comparative Study on Squatter Settlements and Vernacular Architecture, Open House International, vol.18, No.1 pp:41-49, 1993 (Sağlamer, G., Erdoğan N.,)
 Günümüz Küresel Kentlerin Öncülleri: Osmanlı Döneminde Levant Liman Kentleri, YAPI, Sayı:438, 2018, sf.58-63. (Erdoğan, N,)
 İstanbul: Mega Kentten Küreselleşen Kente-Kırmızı Saçlı Kadın, Gösteri Dergisi, Mart-Nisan-Mayıs/2018 sayı:325 sf.62-68 (Erdoğan, N,)

References 

1959 births
Living people
People from Kars
People from İzmit
Academic staff of Trakya University
Turkish architects
Kocaeli University alumni